The 1968–69 Rugby Football League season was the 74th season of rugby league football.

Season summary

Leeds had finished the regular season as League leaders for the third season in a row. They then won their second Championship when they beat Castleford 16-14 in the Championship Final. Bev Risman was awarded the Harry Sunderland Trophy as man-of-the-match.

The Challenge Cup winners were Castleford who beat Salford 11-6 in the final.

The BBC2 Floodlit Trophy winners were Wigan who beat St. Helens 7-4 in the final.

St. Helens won the Lancashire League, and Leeds won the Yorkshire League. St. Helens beat Oldham 30–2 to win the Lancashire County Cup, and Leeds beat Castleford 22–11 to win the Yorkshire County Cup.

Championship

Play-offs

Challenge Cup

Castleford beat Salford 11-6 in the final played at Wembley before a crowd of 97,939. Salford were captained by David Watkins.

This was Castleford’s second Cup Final win in two Final appearances.

To date, this was Salford’s last appearance in a Challenge Cup Final.

References

Sources
1968-69 Rugby Football League season at wigan.rlfans.com
The Challenge Cup at The Rugby Football League website

1968 in English rugby league
1969 in English rugby league
Northern Rugby Football League seasons